The Space Ship Under the Apple Tree is a children's science fiction book series by Louis Slobodkin, and also the name of the first book in the series. The books were published by Macmillan.

The series involves a Boy Scout named Eddie who meets an alien in his apple orchard who comes from the planet Martinea. The series humorously depicts their friendship as Eddie tries to explain the strange things that humans do and why.

Series
 The Space Ship Under the Apple Tree (1952) 
 The Space Ship Returns to the Apple Tree (1958) 
 The Three-Seated Spaceship (1962) 
 Round Trip Spaceship (1968) 
 The Spaceship in the Park (1972)

Eddie also appears as a Cub Scout in an earlier book called Bixxy and the Secret Message (1949).

References

External links
Louis Slobodkin's books

Series of children's books
Children's science fiction novels
American children's novels
1952 children's books